The ACU British Motocross Championship (abbreviated to MXGB and currently known for sponsorship reasons as the Revo MXGB fuelled by Gulf Race Fuels) is the premier Motocross series United Kingdom.

The championship is recognised as being the official British championship in the sport of Motocross by the ACU. It is currently under the stewardship of promoter RHL Activities.

History
There is uncertainty about the origins of motocross but it is likely that it began in 1914 when the Scott Trial was started by Alfred Angas Scott, owner and founder of The Scott Motorcycle Company. The Scott Trial was held on the Yorkshire moors in Northern England and after World War I test riders of new British motorcycles started racing against each other on off-road factory courses.  The French came up with the term 'moto cross' to describe this off-road racing and the first recorded Motocross competition was on Camberley Heath in Surrey, England on 29 March 1924.

Classes
The British Motocross Championship competition is organised into classes of MX1 and MX2.  MX1 is for 251cc to 450cc (fourstroke) and MX2 for 175cc to 250cc 4-stroke motorcycles or 120cc to 250cc 2-stroke motorcycles.

In addition to the senior classes, several youth classes take place across each round in support of the series, forming the British Youth Motocross Championship. These include the 250cc, 125cc, Big-Wheel 85cc, Small-Wheel 85cc & 65cc classes.

The British Women's Motocross Championship, with a supporting youth class, was also revived upon the beginning of the stewardship of current promoter RHL Activities. However, this was discontinued before the start of the 2022 season due to lack of entries.  

A 'Veterans' series was introduced in 2009 with just two rounds. This class was later discontinued and does not form part of the British Motocross Championship.

Auto-Cycle Union
The Auto-Cycle Union (ACU) is the governing body of the British Motocross Championship. The ACU sets the rules for the British Motocross Championship and organises the training of stewards and marshals to ensure track safety.  The ACU also sets and checks safety standards and tracks the progress of national championships.  The ACU has an important role to defend and develop motorcycle sport and is independent of any commercial organisation.

Sponsorship
The British Motocross Championship currently has a title sponsor in Revo Developments, a partnership that has lasted since the start of the 2021 season. Before
the start of the 2021 season, Gulf Race Fuels also joined as a main sponsor - to appear as the 'fuelled by' partner.

Champions

See also
 Scott Trial
 World Enduro Championship

References

External links
 Official web site

Motorcycle off-road racing series
National championships in the United Kingdom
Motocross